In Trance 95 (also abbreviated to IT95) is a Greek electronic music band from Athens.

History
In Trance 95 are a duo from Athens, Greece. They were formed by Alex Machairas and Nik Veliotis in May 1988; Veliotis departed in 1992. Machairas said of his influences, "Albums such as Radio-Activity by Kraftwerk, the first four [albums] of Orchestral Manoeuvres [in the Dark], John Foxx's Metamatic, as well as less known material like for example the cassette Space Museum by Solid Space... influenced me in particular to make me want to create music. And the first period of the Human League and Depeche Mode of course those are key influences."

They released two singles, one 12 inch and one album, while they also appeared in a number of compilations of the time. Their debut 7 inch, the double A Sided "Desire To Desire / Brazilia" was released in December 1988 and it is one of the few known releases of synthpop - cold wave that came from Greece in the '80s. After a period during which Nik Veliotis left to undertake other projects Alex Machairas continued with new member George Geranios in various guises including a subtle change of name to Itenef. A full reformation took place when they were invited by ex Depeche Mode member Alan Wilder to open Recoil's Athens gig in April 2010. But already from 2006 there was a renewed interest in the band that was generated through the increasing popularity of the minimal synth / cold wave sound in the underground circles of mainly New York and central Europe.  The birth of  "Minimal Wave" as a genre brought many obscure electronic artists from the '80s in the surface including In Trance 95. Many of their early tracks eventually got regular airplay at the Minimal Wave program of NY's East Village Radio and eventually in 2010, the duo signed to the New York based label. With Minimal Wave's help, IT95 completed the album "Cities of Steel And Neon" which is a collection of  their early tapes compiled and remastered by the duo themselves and the label's founder  Veronica Vasicka.  In March 2011, In Trance 95 presented their album in a live set before Vasicka's first appearance in Athens during a three-day event dedicated to analogue synthesizers and D.I.Y. tape recorder music of the '80s.

Cities of Steel and Neon

American independent label Minimal Wave announced on July 20, the release of In Trance 95's album Cities of Steel and Neon which came out on October 6 of 2011 as the label's twenty-ninth release. Cities of Steel and Neon features material recorded between 1988-1989: the unreleased 4-track recordings, the highly lauded first single Desire To Desire / Brazilia, and a rare version of 21st Century European Temptation. The LP is pressed on 180 gram black vinyl and housed in a matte sleeve with semi-gloss inner sleeve depicting 1989 video stills of the duo. The sleeve is designed by Peter Miles using an image supplied by the well known New York artist Matthew Bakkom. On December 1 of 2011, Minimal Wave released the digital version of the album with two bonus tracks from 1988, "Gunshot" and "Oslo",  that were also previously unreleased.

Shapes in a New Geometry
In September 2012, Minimal Wave announced the release of Shapes in a New Geometry, an album of entirely new material from In Trance 95. The album first came out as a limited edition cassette on November 14 by the New York based label and included eight tracks, recorded and mixed by Alex Machairas and Nik Veliotis between February and May of the same year. The digital version followed internationally on February 5 of 2013. Since the album's release the duo did a number of live shows including dates in Germany, Belgium, Greece and their first ever gig outside Europe, in Russia on February 22 of 2013.

Discography

Singles

Desire To Desire / Brazilia (Wipe Out 7" WOR-013 15/12/1988)
21st Century European Temptation (Wipe Out 7" WOR-016 12/06/1989)
Warm Nights Driving On Wet Streets (Elfish 12" elf-002 10/09/1991)

Albums

Code Of Obsession  (Wipe Out LP WOR-029 09/07/1990)
Cities Of Steel And Neon (Minimal Wave LP & Digital with two bonus tracks MW-029 06/10/2011 & 01/12/2011)
Shapes In A New Geometry (Minimal Wave Chrome Cassette & Digital MW043 14/11/2012 & 05/02/2013)

Compilations

Random Relations Vol.1 (Elfish LP elf-004 1992)
Crash - A Tribute to JG Ballard (Elfish CD elf-013 1993)
Minimal Wave Tapes Vol.2 (Minimal Wave / Stones Throw double LP, CD & Digital STH2281 29/02/2012)

EPs

Ocean (Indivisible CD IDV-01 1995)
Overcast (Indivisible CD IDV-03 1995)

Remixes

OMD - If You Want It (IT95 remix) available on OMD's album History of Modern (German digital edition 2010 / Greece Undo records CDUN25B 2011) 
HNN - Renouveau Ordinaire (In Trance 95 remix) from "Pièce Radiophonique remixes" album (TBR autumn 2012)

References

External links 
  Official website
  Band profile on Minimal Wave Records site
 Article of The Electricity Club
 Band interview published at Minimal Wave's site, July 2010
 In Trance 95 supporting Recoil
 Review of Cities Of Steel & Neon from the American site The Other Music
 In Trance 95 interview at avopolis site, published November 2011

Greek pop music groups
Electronica music groups
Electronic music duos
Musical groups from Athens
Minimal wave groups